Vingoe is a Cornish surname.

Origin and variants 
Vingoe is an occupational name from the Penwith region of Cornwall near Land's End. According to storyteller, William Bottrell, the surname is thought to derive from an anglicized variant of the original Norman French words "vin" meaning "wine" and "goût" meaning "taste." It has also been suggested that the name might actually be of Cornish origin, deriving from the Cornish words "win" and "go" meaning "little marsh," although this is not widely agreed upon. The name may also be related to the French Huguenot surname "Vigneron" which means "winegrower," and a number of related anglicized variations, including Vigneau, Vigno, Wigneau, Wingoe, Wingar, Wingor, and Wingo.

Rare, the Vingoe surname is most commonly found today in Cornwall and England, but is also present in Canada and the United States.

Until the gradual standardization of English spelling in the last few centuries, English lacked any comprehensive system of spelling. Cornish and Norman names, particularly as they were anglicized from their original languages, historically displayed wide variations in recorded spellings as scribes of the era spelled words according to how they sounded rather than any set of rules. This means that a person's name was often spelled several different ways over a lifetime. As such, different variations of the Vingoe surname usually have the same origin.

Notable people sharing the surname "Vingoe" 

 Mary Vingoe, Canadian playwright and theatre director

See also 
Cornish surnames

References

 Surnames
 Cornish-language surnames
 Surnames of British Isles origin